James Thompson Maffett (February 2, 1837 – December 19, 1912) was a Republican member of the U.S. House of Representatives from Pennsylvania.

James T.Maffett was born in Clarion Township, Pennsylvania. He attended the common schools, Rimersburg Academy, and Jefferson College in Canonsburg, Pennsylvania (now Washington & Jefferson College).  He taught school in Missouri for one year, and then, in 1859, moved to California, where he taught school in Amador County and began the study of law.  He returned to Pennsylvania in 1870 and continued the study of law.  He was admitted to the bar in Brookville, Pennsylvania, in 1872 and commenced the practice of his profession in Clarion.  He was an unsuccessful candidate for the Republican nomination for Congress in 1884.

Maffett was elected as a Republican to the Fiftieth Congress.  He was not a candidate for renomination in 1888.  He resumed the practice of his profession and died in Clarion in 1912.  Interment in Clarion Cemetery.

Sources

The Political Graveyard

Pennsylvania lawyers
Washington & Jefferson College alumni
1837 births
1912 deaths
Republican Party members of the United States House of Representatives from Pennsylvania
Burials in Pennsylvania
19th-century American politicians
19th-century American lawyers